Zolani Tete (born 8 March 1988) is a South African professional boxer. He is a former two-weight world champion, having held the IBF junior-bantamweight title from 2014 to 2015 and the WBO bantamweight title from 2017 to 2019.

Early life and amateur career
Tete grew up in the Mdantsane township. He had a rough childhood. His father was a pastor. Him and his brother, Makazole, took up boxing when Zolani was eight. Tete looked up to South African former world champions Vuyani Bungu and Welcome Ncita while in the unpaid ranks. Tete would later be trained by Bungu. He claims to have over 400 amateur fights, only three of which were losses.

Professional career

Flyweight
Tete made his professional debut in May 2006. He won his first 8 fights by stoppage. In his eighth bout he won the WBF flyweight title, which he defended twice. Tete earned a shot at a major world title for the first time, beating Richard Garcia in a title eliminator by unanimous decision (118-108, 118–108, 118–110). Tete went on to face Moruti Mthalane for the IBF flyweight title, suffering his first loss with a round 5 technical knockout (TKO).

Junior bantamweight
After the loss to Mthalane, Tete moved up to junior-bantamweight. He received another opportunity to fight in an IBF eliminator, but lost a majority decision (112–115, 112–115, 113–113) to Juan Alberto Rosas. After a bounce-back win, Tete fought in yet another eliminator but lost by split decision (113–115, 114–115, 115–114) to Roberto Sosa. Tete seem to befuddle Sosa with his length early on, but as the fight went on Sosa surged and earned the nod. Sosa received a warning due to low blows but there was no point deductions.

In November 2013, Tete would fight in a third IBF junior-bantamweight eliminator against former champion Juan Carlos Sánchez Jr. Sánchez had lost the IBF title due to coming in overweight against Sosa, thus leaving the title vacant after beating Sosa. The winner would be the IBF's mandatory challenger to the winner of the Liborio Solís-Daiki Kameda unification bout. Tete knocked down Sánchez in round five before being dropped himself in round six. After being knocked down, Tete resorted to excessive holding, losing points in rounds eight and nine. However, he was able to put Sánchez away in round ten.

Solís would beat Kameda, but he also lost his title on the scales, leaving the IBF title vacant. Tete would face Teiru Kinoshita in July 2014 for the vacant title, winning a comfortable unanimous decision (119–109, 119–109, 118–110). After one successful defence, he chose to vacate the title rather than fight mandatory challenger McJoe Arroyo. Tete went on to sign with British promoter Frank Warren in December 2015.

Bantamweight
Tete made his bantamweight debut in 2016. In his third fight at the weight, Tete claimed the WBO interim by beating Arthur Villanueva. Tete won a wide unanimous decision (120–107, 119–108, 119–108), dropping Villanueva in round eleven. Tete was later elevated to full champion by the WBO.

Tete vs. Narvaez 
On April 21, 2018, Tete defended his WBO belt against Omar Narvaez, who was WBO #1 ranked contender at the time. In a highly unexciting bout, Tete still manage to get a unanimous decision victory, winning 120–108 on all three scorecards.

Tete vs. Aloyan 
In his next title defense, Tete faced Mikhail Aloyan, ranked #5 by the WBA and #6 by the WBO. Tete won the fight on all three scorecards, 114–111, 114-111 and 114–110.

Tete vs. Donaire cancellation
Tete was scheduled to face Nonito Donaire on April 27, 2019, but pulled out of the fight due to a shoulder injury.

Tete vs. Casimero 
In his next bout, Tete fought former world champion John Riel Casimero. Casimero dropped Tete twice before the referee waved the fight off in the third round and awarded Casimero the TKO win.

Professional boxing record

See also 
List of super-flyweight boxing champions
List of bantamweight boxing champions

References

External links

Zolani Tete - Profile, News Archive & Current Rankings at Box.Live

1988 births
Living people
Super-flyweight boxers
Flyweight boxers
Bantamweight boxers
South African male boxers
People from the Eastern Cape
World super-flyweight boxing champions
World bantamweight boxing champions
International Boxing Federation champions
World Boxing Organization champions
Sportspeople from the Eastern Cape